Anzolin is a surname. Notable people with the surname include:

Roberto Anzolin (1938–2017), Italian footballer
Matteo Anzolin (born 2000), Italian footballer